Yuri Sena dos Reis Batista (born 3 January 2001), known as Yuri Sena or simply Yuri, is a Brazilian footballer who plays as a goalkeeper for Vitória.

Club career
Born in Salvador, Yuri was a Vitória youth graduate. Promoted to the first team for the 2020 season, he was initially a fourth-choice behind Ronaldo, César and Lucas Arcanjo.

On 11 December 2020, as both César and Lucas Arcanjo tested positive for COVID-19, Yuri made his professional debut, coming on as a first-half substitute for injured Ronaldo in a 0–1 home loss against Cruzeiro for the Série B championship.

International career
In 2017, Yuri was called up to Brazil under-17s for the Montaigu Tournament and the FIFA U-17 World Cup, being a backup option in both competitions. In 2019, he was called up to the full side by manager Tite to complete the trainings ahead of the 2019 Copa América.

Career statistics

References

External links

2001 births
Living people
Sportspeople from Salvador, Bahia
Brazilian footballers
Association football goalkeepers
Campeonato Brasileiro Série B players
Esporte Clube Vitória players